A Son of the Desert is a 1928 American silent drama film directed by Merrill McCormick and starring McCormick, Marin Sais and Bob Burns.

Synopsis
Helen Dobson, an American art student travelling through the Arabian peninsula arranges to paint the portrait of a sheikh but soon finds herself in trouble and is rescued by a Texas cowboy friend.

Cast
 Merrill McCormick as Sheik Hammid Zayad 
 Marin Sais as Helen Dobson 
 Bob Burns as Steve Kinard 
 Faith Hope as Zuebida 
 Jim Welch as Colonel Dobson

References

Bibliography
 Munden, Kenneth White. The American Film Institute Catalog of Motion Pictures Produced in the United States, Part 1. University of California Press, 1997.

External links

1928 films
1928 drama films
Silent American drama films
American silent feature films
1920s English-language films
American black-and-white films
1920s American films